Yang Yinliu (1899–1984) was a musicologist from the People's Republic of China. He was the editor of the Zhongguo Yinyue Cidian (中国音乐词典, Dictionary of Chinese Music). He was born in Wuxi, Jiangsu, and was a professor at Central Conservatory of Music in Beijing.

One part of his research was dedicated to the Chinese folk musician Hua Yanjun (Abing) (华彥君- 阿炳, ca. 1893-1950).

References
Yang Yinliu (editor): Zhongguo yinyue cidian (Dictionary of Chinese Music). Beijing, 1984 (includes short biography)
Zhongguo renming da cidian (中国人名大词典 Dictionary of Chinese People, 1992)
Cihai (辞海 "Sea of Words," 2003)

External links
 Yang Yinliu in Chinese online encyclopedia Weike
 The Life of Abing, with a photo of Yang Yinliu

1899 births
1984 deaths
Chinese musicologists
Musicians from Wuxi
20th-century musicologists
Educators from Wuxi
Writers from Wuxi